Mount Bolton is a prominent mountain in western Wisconsin Range in Antarctica,  high, standing  southeast of Mount Soyat along the east side of Reedy Glacier. It was mapped by the United States Geological Survey from surveys and U.S. Navy air photos, 1960–64. The mountain was named by Advisory Committee on Antarctic Names for Lieutenant James L. Bolton, U.S. Navy, helicopter pilot on U.S. Navy Operation Deepfreeze 1965, 1966 and 1967.

References

Bolton, Mount